The Battle of Claremore Mound, also known as the Battle of the Strawberry Moon, or the Claremore Mound Massacre, was one of the chief battles of the war between the Osage and Cherokee Indians. It occurred in June 1817, when a band of Western Cherokee and their allies under Chief Spring Frog (Too-an-tuh) attacked Pasuga, an Osage village at the foot of Claremore Mound (in present-day Rogers County, Oklahoma). The village was nearly empty; only women, children, and the very sick and elderly remained there. Most of the village was currently away on a seasonal hunt that often lasted up to three or four months. The Cherokee killed or captured every remaining member of Chief Clermont's band and destroyed everything they could not carry away. Historians consider it one of the bloodiest Native American massacres in modern history.

Conflict between Osage and Cherokee
On November 10, 1808, at Fort Osage, Missouri, the Osage Nation made a treaty with the United States, ceding all of its land east of a line that ran south from Fort Clark to the Arkansas River and all of its land west of the Missouri River. The land reserved to the Osage Nation was further reduced by treaties signed at St. Louis (June 2, 1825, Fort Gibson (January 11, 1839) and Canville, Kansas (September 29, 1865).

According to Eaton, the Osage established two main villages about 1800, when they migrated to the area between the Verdigris and Grand rivers. These were called Pasona (near present-day Claremore, Oklahoma) and Pasuga (at the foot of Claremore Mound).

In the early 1800s, a portion of the Cherokee people, who had been living in the Southeastern United States, had begun moving to land historically claimed by other tribes west of the Mississippi River. These were those Cherokees referred to as the Old Settlers, or western Cherokee. This produced a long period of conflict between the Cherokee migrants and the Osage. The Osage tribes had dominated the Central Plains area in today's Kansas, Missouri, Oklahoma, as well as Arkansas. The Osage often took captives (mostly women and children), and killing others, trying to drive out the invaders. Cherokees retaliated in kind, but were ineffective at stopping the raids. By 1817, an estimated three thousand Western Cherokees had settled in the area known as Lovely's Purchase in the Arkansaw district of the Missouri Territory.

The Cherokee-led attack
In January 1817 the Arkansas Cherokee began planning a retaliatory attack against the Osage and began asking their relatives from the east to aid them in a battle against the Osage. They also asked for help from  the Choctawe, Chickasaw, Delaware, and others, including whites.

The Cherokee knew that Osage men left their villages lightly guarded during the Strawberry Moon to go on a long-distance hunt for bison. Therefore, this would be the most opportune time to attack.

The Cherokee were enraged by the treatment they had endured at the hands of the Osage, which helped offset the greater numbers of the Osage had. The Cherokee had another advantage as they had acquired more modern weapons - rifles - and were well-experienced in their use. Which finally gave them a match able force against the Osage tribe who had acquired guns in the 1600s from their trading with the French and all Warriors were well acquainted with.

Some 500 Cherokee, along with a number of Choctaw, Chickasaw and whites, convened at a place on the Arkansas River. (The modern city of Russellville, Arkansas developed here.) They traveled upriver into Indian Territory and went overland to the Osage villages.  After luring a representative of the Southern Osage away from the village, the invading party attacked, killing thirty-eight Osage and taking one hundred and four captives.  According to Eaton, Chief Clermont was present at the time of the attack and was killed during the fighting. He was later buried on Claremore Mound. Another source indicates that Pasuga was attacked first, and that the inhabitants of Pasona had been alerted by the sounds and smells of smoke when the marauders burned the village. The Pasugans hid in a cave previously discovered and prepared as a hideout by Black Dog, who had gone on the buffalo hunt. Thus, they survived the raid on their village and could care for the few survivors from Pasuga.

The aftermath
Most of the Osage warriors had been away on a hunt when their village was attacked.  In an attempt to maintain peace with the U.S. government they did not retaliate immediately. Some time later (1820) the Cherokee followed the Osage further up the river. The Osage knew they were coming and were ready and had gathered numbers and allies. The Osage decimated Cherokee. Instead of cowing the Osage, the defeat at Claremore mound stirred them to greater fury. The bitter frontier war continued in unabated with Osage’s raiding and killing indiscriminately as they retreated down the river their Osage sons (Mad Buffalo) and grandsons were waiting in ambush. At every Cherokee retreat an Osage ambush party of Claremore descent was waiting to slaughter the fleeing Cherokees. For twenty years the descendants of Claremore attacked the Cherokees. The Osage who were taken captive were given to the Eastern Cherokee as payment for their contributions in the battle. In December of the same year construction began on Fort Smith between the Cherokee and Osage settlements. The following summer the U.S. forced the Osage to cede more land to the Cherokee who were settling in the area, apparently because of their victories after the Battle of Claremore Mound (Oklahoma a history of five centuries).

In December 1818 the U.S. government began construction of a fort on the Arkansas River, close to the western border of Arkansas Territory. When completed, Fort Smith was staffed with troops whose primary mission was to prevent further hostilities between the Osage and the Western Cherokee. In 1824, this function was transferred to Fort Gibson, which was built near the confluence of the Grand and Verdigris rivers in Indian Territory. Fort Smith was abandoned until a replacement was constructed several years later.

The Osage continued to live in the area until they moved to the Osage Reservation in 1839.

Site marker
The Oklahoma Historical Society erected a marker at the site of the battle. Coordinates of the marker are: .

See also

 List of battles fought in Oklahoma

Notes

Sources
 Eaton, Rachel Caroline. "The Legend of the Battle of Claremore Mound", Chronicles of Oklahoma 8:4 (December 1930) 369-376 (retrieved August 16, 2006).
 Rollings, Willard H. The Osage: An Ethnohistorical Study of Hegemony on the Prairie-Plains (University of Missouri Press, 1992), pp. 230–255
 Mathews, John Joseph. The Osages: Children of the Middle Waters. (University of Oklahoma Press, 1961) pp. 416–418

External links
 Rogers County, Oklahoma
 Encyclopedia of Oklahoma History and Culture - Claremore's Mound, Battle of

References

Conflicts in 1817
Claremore Mound
Pre-statehood history of Oklahoma
Battles involving the Cherokee
Osage Nation
Claremore 
Claremore 
June 1817 events